Christmas is the fourth studio album and first Christmas album from Christian pop rock singer Rebecca St. James. It was released on 7 October 1997 through ForeFront Records. The album was produced by Tedd T.

Track listing

Personnel 
 Rebecca St. James – lead and backing vocals
 Tedd T – arrangements, programming, keyboards, loops, guitar, electric guitar 
 Byron Hagen – Hammond organ, string arrangements
 David Cleveland – acoustic guitar 
 Vince Emmett – mandolin 
 Charles Garrett – acoustic guitar, electric guitar 
 Carlos Pennell – guitar
 Micah Wilshire – acoustic guitar 
 Chuck Zwicky – guitar
 Brent Milligan – guitar, bass
 Otto Price – bass
 Dan Needham – drums 
 Andrew Payne – drums, djembe
 Carl Marsh – string arrangements
 John Catchings – cello
 Antoine Silverman – violin

Production
 Tedd T – producer, engineer
 Dan Brock – executive producer
 Eddie DeGarmo – executive producer
 Jullian Kindred – engineer, mixing
 Michael Quinlan – engineer
 Marcelo Pennell – mixing
 Chuck Zwicky – mixing
 Ken Love – mastering at Master Mix (Nashville, TN).
 Tom Davis – art direction, design
 Frank W. Ockenfels III – photography

Charts 
Album - Billboard (North America)

Singles - CCM Magazine (North America)

Singles 
Although no official radio singles released off Christmas, a music video was made for "O Come All Ye Faithful".

Note 
The signature "war is over" chant in "Happy Christmas" (she spells out the whole word) and also the eponymous part of the song's title itself are intentionally omitted by the artist.  In 2003, she read letters from United States soldiers to be aired on Fox News Channel during the Christmas season;  furthermore, she and her record label, EMI Group plc, have released a music video of her song "I Thank You" (from Wait for Me) that saluted all troops (especially US, UK, Australia) in the successful conquest against Saddam Hussein in Iraq.

References 

1997 Christmas albums
Christmas albums by Australian artists
ForeFront Records albums
Rebecca St. James albums